Dennis Allan Ahlburg is an Australian American economist who is Distinguished Professor of Economics Emeritis at Trinity University where he served as the university's 18th president.

Career
Before his role with Trinity, he was the Dean of the Leeds Business Faculty at the University of Colorado at Boulder, with a previous professorship at the University of Minnesota. On May 15, 2014, Ahlburg announced that he would step down as Trinity University president effective January 1, 2015. He is a Distinguished Professor of Economics at Trinity.

References

Trinity University (Texas) faculty
University of Minnesota faculty
University of Colorado Boulder faculty
Living people
Year of birth missing (living people)